Attorney General Macdonald may refer to:

Alexander Macdonald (British Columbia politician) (1918–2014), Attorney General of British Columbia
Gordon MacDonald (American politician) (born 1961), Attorney General of New Hampshire
John A. Macdonald (1815–1891), Attorney General of the Province of Canada
John Sandfield Macdonald (1812–1872), Attorney General of Ontario
Malcolm Archibald Macdonald (1875–1941), Attorney General of British Columbia

See also
Joseph E. McDonald (1819–1891), Attorney General of Indiana
Ross McDonald (1888–1964), Attorney-General of Western Australia